Events in the year 2018 in Greenland.

Incumbents
 Monarch – Margrethe II
 High Commissioner – Mikaela Engell
 Premier – Kim Kielsen
 Speaker of the Inatsisartut – Hans Enoksen

Events

24 April – 2018 Greenlandic general election

Sports 
16 to 24 June – Greenland hosted the 2018 Pan American Men's Handball Championship

Deaths

9 July – Hans-Pavia Rosing, politician and civil servant (b. 1948).

2 August – Ûssarĸak K'ujaukitsoĸ, Inuit politician and human rights activist, member of the Inatsisartut (b. 1948).

References

 
2010s in Greenland
Years of the 21st century in Greenland
Greenland
Greenland